"I Just Love You More at Christmas" is a single released by the band Magic Eight Ball.

Music video 
A music video was shot on November 6, 2014, for their Christmas single at Brigidine School in Windsor with Oly Edkins, combining a live performance for all the staff and students in the process.

Track listing

Personnel

Musicians 
 Baz Francis - Vocals, guitars, bass and keys 
 Chris West - Sleigh bells and gang vocals on track 1 
 Jason Bowld - Drums on track 1 
 Robbie J. Holland - Live bass

Production 
 Dave Draper - Recording, programming, mixing & mastering 
 Baz Francis - Programming, re-arrangement
 Mike Corbyn - Re-arrangement
 Sam Browne - Re-arrangement
 Chris West - Programming

Art Direction 
 Oly Edkins - Music video director
 Baz Francis - Artwork design & photography
 Tariq Hussain - Artwork layout

References

External links

2014 singles
2014 songs